Barla is a surname. Notable people with the surname include:

Dayamani Barla (21st century), Indian journalist
Lazarus Barla (born 1979), Indian field hockey player
Luca Barla (born 1987), Italian road bicycle racer
Mihály Barla (1778–1824), Slovenian Lutheran pastor, writer, and poet